Mary DuBose Garrard (born 1937) is an American art historian and emerita professor at American University. She is recognized as "one of the founders of feminist art theory" and is particularly known for her work on the Baroque painter Artemisia Gentileschi.

Education 
Garrard earned her B.A. degree at H. Sophie Newcomb Memorial College in 1958, her M.A. degree at Harvard University in 1960, and her Ph.D. at Johns Hopkins University in 1970. writing her dissertation on "The Early Sculpture of Jacopo Sansovino—Florence and Rome."

Work
From 1974 to 1976, Garrard served as the second national president of the Women’s Caucus for Art.

Garrard's feminist scholarship began with articles in the 1970s, including "Of Men, Women and Art: Some Historical Reflections" (Art Journal, 1976) and "Feminism: Has It Changed Art History?" (Heresies, 1978).

With Norma Broude, Garrard co-authored and edited several books on art history and curated an exhibition, Claiming Space: Some American Feminist Originators, in 2007 at the Katzen Arts Center.

Selected publications
Artemisia Gentileschi: The Image of the Female Hero in Italian Baroque Art (Princeton: Princeton University Press, 1989), 
Artemisia Gentileschi Around 1622: The Shaping and Reshaping of an Artistic Identity (University of California Press, 2001), 
Brunelleschi's Egg: Nature, Art, and Gender in Renaissance Italy (University of California Press, 2010), 
Artemisia Gentileschi and Feminism in Early Modern Europe (Reaktion, 2020),

With Norma Broude
Feminism and Art History: Questioning the Litany (Harper & Row, 1982), 
The Expanding Discourse: Feminism and Art History (Icon Editions, 1992), 
The Power of Feminist Art: The American Movement of the 1970s, History and Impact (Harry N. Abrams, 1996), 
Reclaiming Female Agency: Feminist Art History after Postmodernism (University of California Press, 2005), 
Claiming Space: Some American Feminist Originators (American University, 2007)

Awards 
 Lifetime Achievement Award, Women’s Caucus for Art, 2005
 Faculty Legacy Award, American University, voted by CAS alumni as professor who had greatest influence on their lives, 2002
 Award from College Art Association, Committee on Women, for “pioneering feminist scholarship” (with Norma Broude), 2000
 Honorary doctorate of humane letters, awarded by Millsaps College, Jackson, Mississippi, 1999
 Mississippi Institute of Arts and Letters Award (with Norma Broude), 1995
 Mid-Career Achievement Award, National Women’s Caucus for Art, 1991
 AU College of Arts and Sciences award, Outstanding Scholarship, Research & Other Professional Contributions, 1990
 AU College of Arts and Sciences award, Outstanding Teaching, 1989

Grants and sponsored research 
 American University Mellon Fund Travel Award, September 1998
 National Endowment for the Humanities, Fellowship, 1991–92
 J. Paul Getty Foundation, subvention to Princeton University Press to support publication of Artemisia Gentileschi, 1987
 Mina Shaughnessy Scholars Program Fund for the Improvement of Post-Secondary Education, Department of Education, 1982
 American Association of University Women Fellowship, 1978–79
 American Council of Learned Societies, 1978–79
 Fulbright scholar, Italy, 1963–64

References

External links
Mary Garrard at American University
Norma Broude and Mary Garrard papers, 1970-2000 at the Smithsonian Institution's Archives of American Art
 

Living people
American art historians
Women art historians
American University faculty and staff
Harvard University alumni
Tulane University alumni
Johns Hopkins University alumni
1937 births
20th-century American historians
American women historians
21st-century American historians
20th-century American women writers
Feminist theorists
Feminist historians
21st-century American women writers